Cathedral of the Assumption of the Blessed Virgin Mary may refer to:

 Cathedral of the Assumption of the Blessed Virgin Mary (Rožňava), Slovakia
 Cathedral of the Assumption of the Blessed Virgin Mary (Saint Petersburg), Russia
 Cathedral of the Assumption of the Blessed Virgin Mary, Rab, Croatia
 Cathedral of the Assumption of the Blessed Virgin Mary, Kharkiv, Ukraine
 Cathedral of the Assumption of the Blessed Virgin Mary (Lymanske), Ukraine
 Cathedral of the Assumption of the Blessed Virgin Mary, Tuam, Ireland